Grand Prix Construction Set is a racing video game for the BBC Micro released in 1987 by Superior Software. It is a simulation of Formula One coupled with a track editor. It can be played in full screen single-player or two-player split screen modes.

Unlike the majority of Superior's BBC Micro games at the time, it was not possible to convert the game to the Acorn Electron but a game that started out as an Electron equivalent became the BBC/Electron motorbike racing game Crazee Rider.

Legacy
It was also available on the 1988 Superior Software compilation Play It Again Sam 4, along with Frak!, Cosmic Camouflage, and Spellbinder.

See also
Racing Destruction Set
Rally Speedway

References 

1987 video games
Acornsoft games
BBC Micro and Acorn Electron games
BBC Micro and Acorn Electron-only games
Europe-exclusive video games
Multiplayer and single-player video games
Split-screen multiplayer games
Superior Software games
Video games developed in the United Kingdom
Video games with user-generated gameplay content